The North Carolina House of Representatives election of 2002 were held on November 5, 2002, as part of the biennial election to the General Assembly.  All 120 seats in the North Carolina House of Representatives were elected.

It is not to be confused with the election to the United States House of Representatives, which was held in North Carolina on the same day.

Results Summary

Detailed Results

Districts 1-19

District 1
Incumbent Democrat Bill Owens has represented the 1st district since 1995

District 2
The 2nd district overlaps with much of the former 86th district. Incumbent Democrat Bill Culpepper, who has represented the 86th district since 1993, was re-elected here.

District 3
Incumbent Democrat Alice Graham Underhill has represented the 3rd district since 2001, she lost re-election to Republican Michael Gorman.

District 4
The new 4th district overlaps with much of the former 6th district. Incumbent Democrat Gene Rogers, who has represented the 6th district since 1987, didn't seek re-election.  Democrat Charles Elliott Johnson won the open seat.

District 5
Incumbent Democrat Howard J. Hunter Jr. has represented the 5th district since 1989.

District 6
The new 6th district overlaps with much of the former 2nd district. Incumbent Democrat Zeno L. Edwards, who has represented the 2nd district since 1993, didn't seek re-election  Democrat Arthur Williams won the open seat.

District 7
Incumbent Democrat John Hall has represented the 7th district since his appointment on February 4, 2000. Hall was elected to his first full term.

District 8
Incumbent Democrat Edith Warren has represented the 8th district since 1999.

District 9
Incumbent Democrat Marian McLawhorn has represented the 9th district since 1999.

District 10
Incumbent Democrat Russell Tucker has represented the 10th district since 1999. He lost re-election to Republican Stephen LaRoque.

District 11
Incumbent Democrat Phil Baddour has represented the 11th district since 1993. He lost re-election to Republican Louis Pate.

District 12
The new 12th district overlaps with much of the former 79th district. Incumbent Democrat William L. Wainwright, who has represented the 79th district and its predecessors since 1991, was re-elected here.

District 13
The new 13th district overlaps with much of the former 4th district. Incumbent Republican Jean Preston, who has represented the 4th district since 1993, was re-elected here.

District 14
The new 14th district is based in Onslow County and is expected to favor Republicans. Republican Keith Williams won the open seat.

District 15
The new 15th district overlaps with much of the former 80th district. Incumbent Republican Robert Grady, who has represented the 80th district and its predecessors since 1987, was re-elected here.

District 16
The new 16th district includes all of Pender County and a portion of New Hanover County. Republican Carolyn Justice won the open seat.

District 17
The new 17th district overlaps with the southern portion of the old 14th district. Incumbent Democrat David Redwine, who has represented the 14th district since 1985, lost re-election here to Republican Bonner Stiller.

District 18
The new 18th district overlaps with much of the former 98th district. Incumbent Democrat Thomas Wright, who has represented the 98th district since 1993, was re-elected here.

District 19
The new 19th district overlaps with much of the former 13th district. Incumbent Republican Danny McComas, who has represented the 13th district since 1995, was re-elected here.

Districts 20-39

District 20
The new 20th district overlaps with the northern portion of the former 14th district. Incumbent Democrat Dewey Hill, who has represented the 14th district since 1993, was re-elected here.

District 21
The new 21st district overlaps with much of the former 97th district. Incumbent Democrat Larry Bell, who has represented the 97th district since 2001, was re-elected here.

District 22
The new 22nd district overlaps with much of the former 96th district. Incumbent Democrat Edd Nye, who has represented the 96th district and its predecessors since 1985, was re-elected here.

District 23
The new 23rd district overlaps with much of the former 71st district. Incumbent Democrat Joe Tolson, who has represented the 71st district since 1997, was re-elected here.

District 24
The new 24th district overlaps with much of the former 70th district. Incumbent Democrat Shelly Willingham, who has represented the 70th district since his appointment on January 28, 2002, ran for re-election. Willingham lost re-nomination to Democrat Jean Farmer-Butterfield, who won the general election.

District 25
The new 25th district overlaps with much of the former 72nd district. Incumbent Republican Gene G. Arnold, who has represented the 72nd district since 1993, didn't seek re-election. Republican Bill Daughtridge won the open seat.

District 26
The new 26th district overlaps with much of the former 20th district. Incumbent Republican Billy Creech, who has represented the 20th district since 1989, was re-elected here.

District 27
The new 27th district overlaps with much of the former 78th district. Incumbent Democrat Stanley Fox, who has represented the 78th district since 1995, was re-elected here.

District 28
The new 28th district overlaps with much of the former 95th district. Incumbent Republican Leo Daughtry, who has represented the 95th district and its predecessors since 1993, was re-elected here.

District 29
The new 29th district overlaps with much of the southwest portion of the former 23rd district. Incumbent Democrat Paul Miller, who has represented the 23rd district since 2001, was re-elected here.

District 30
The new 30th district overlaps with much of the western portion of the former 23rd district. Incumbent Democrat Paul Luebke, who has represented the 23rd district since 1991, was re-elected here.

District 31
The new 31st district overlaps with much of the eastern portion of the old 23rd district. Incumbent Democrat Mickey Michaux, who has represented the 23rd district since 1985, was re-elected here.

District 32
The new 32nd district overlaps with much of the eastern portion of the old 22nd district. Incumbent Democrat Jim Crawford, who has represented the 22nd district since 1995, was re-elected here.

District 33
The new 33rd district overlaps with much of the former 21st district. Incumbent Democrat Dan Blue, who has represented the 21st district and its predecessors since 1981, didn't seek re-election. Democrat Bernard Allen won the open seat.

District 34
The new 34th district overlaps with much of the former 61st district. Incumbent Republican Art Pope, who has represented the 61st district since 1999, didn't seek re-election. Republican Don Munford won the open seat.

District 35
he new 35th district overlaps with much of the former 63rd district. Incumbent Democrat Jennifer Weiss, who has represented the 63rd district since 1999, was re-elected here.

District 36
The new 36th district overlaps with much of the former 62nd district. Incumbent Republican David Miner, who has represented the 62nd district since 1993, was re-elected here.

District 37
The new 37th district is an open seat based in southwestern Wake County and it is expected to favor Republicans. Republican Paul Stam won the open seat.
204

District 38
The new 38th district overlaps with much of the former 64th district. Incumbent Democrat Bob Hensley, who has represented the 64th district since 1991, didn't seek re-election. Democrat Deborah Ross won the open seat.

District 39
The new 39th district overlaps with much of the former 15th district. Incumbent Republican Sam Ellis, who has represented the 15th district since 1993, was re-elected here.

Districts 40-59

District 40
The new 40th district overlaps with much of the former 65th district. Incumbent Republican Rick Eddins, who has represented the 65th district since 1995, was re-elected here

District 41
The new 41st district overlaps with the eastern portion of the old 18th district. Incumbent Republican Mia Morris, who has represented the 18th district since 1997, lost re-election here to Democrat Margaret Dickson.

District 42
The new 42nd district overlaps with much of the former 17th district. Incumbent Democrat Marvin Lucas, who has represented the 17th district since 2001, was re-elected here.

District 43

District 44

District 45

District 46
The new 46th district overlaps with much of the former 16th district. Incumbent Democrat Douglas Yongue, who has represented the 16th district since 1993, was re-elected here.

District 47
The new 47th district overlaps with much of the former 85th district. Incumbent Democrat Ronnie Sutton, who has represented the 85th district since 1993, was re-elected here.

District 48
The new 48th district overlaps with much of the former 87th district. Incumbent Democrat Donald Bonner, who has represented the 87th district since 1997, was re-elected here.

District 49
The new 49th district includes all of Franklin County, as well as portions of Warren and Halifax counties. Democrat Lucy Allen won the open seat.

District 50
The new 50th district overlaps with much of the former 92nd district. Incumbent Republican Russell Capps, who has represented the 92nd district since 1995, was re-elected here.

District 51
The new 51st district overlaps with much of the western portion of the former 19th district. Incumbent Democrat Leslie Cox, who has represented the 19th district since 1999, lost re-election here to Republican John Sauls.

District 52
The new 52nd district overlaps with much of the former 31st district. Incumbent Republican Richard Morgan, who has represented the 31st district since 1991, was re-elected here.

District 53
The new 53rd district overlaps with the eastern portion of the former 19th district. Incumbent Republican Donald S. Davis, who has represented the 19th district since 1995, didn't seek re-election. Republican David Lewis won the open seat.

District 54
The new 54th district overlaps with southern portion of the former 24th district. Incumbent Democrat Joe Hackney, who has represented the 24th district and its predecessors since 1981, was re-elected here.

District 55
The new 55th district overlaps with much of the western portion of the former 22nd district. Incumbent Democrat Gordon Allen, who has represented the 22nd district since 1997, was re-elected here.

District 56
The new 56th district overlaps with the northern portion with the 24th district. Incumbent Democrat Verla Insko, who has represented the 24th district since 1997, was re-elected here.

District 57
The new 57th district overlaps with much of the former 29th district. Incumbent Republican Joanne Bowie, who has represented the 29th district and its predecessor since 1989, was re-elected here.

District 58
The new 58th district overlaps with much of the former 26th district. Incumbent Democrat Alma Adams, who has represented the 26th district since 1994, was re-elected here.

District 59
The new 59th district overlaps with much of the former 89th district. Incumbent Democrat Maggie Jeffus, who has represented the 89th district and its predecessors since 1991, was re-elected here.

Districts 60-79

District 60
The new 60th district is based in Guilford County and is expected to favor Democrats. Democrat Earl Jones won the open seat.

District 61
The new 61st district is based in Guilford County and is expected to favor Republicans. Republican Stephen Wood won the open seat.

District 62
The new 62nd district overlaps with much of the former 27th district. Incumbent Republican John Blust, who has represented the 27th district since 2001, was re-elected here.

District 63
The new 63rd district is based in Alamance County and isn't safe for either party. Democrat Alice Bordsen won the open seat.

District 64
There new 64th district overlaps with much of the southern portion of the former 25th district. The new district includes the homes of incumbent Republicans Cary Allred, who has represented the 25th district since 1995, and W. B. Teague, who has represented the 25th district since 1999. Allred was re-elected here.

District 65
The new 65th district overlaps with much of the northern portion of the former 25th district. Incumbent Democrat Nelson Cole, who has represented the 25th district since 1997, was re-elected here.

District 66
The new 66th district overlaps with much of the former 73rd district. Incumbent Republican Wayne Sexton, who has represented the 73rd district since 1993, was re-elected here.

District 67
The new 67th district overlaps with much of the former 30th district. Incumbent Republican Arlie Culp, who has represented the 30th district since 1989, was re-elected here

District 68
The new 68th district overlaps with much of the former 32nd district. Incumbent Democrat Wayne Goodwin, who has represented the 32nd district since 1997, was re-elected here

District 69
The new 69th district overlaps with much of the former 33rd district. Incumbent Democrat Pryor Gibson, who has represented the 33rd district since 1999, was re-elected here.

District 70
The new 70th district overlaps with much of the former 82nd district. Incumbent Republican Bobby H. Barbee Sr., who has represented the 82nd district and its predecessors since 1987, was re-elected here.

District 71
The new 71st district overlaps with much of the former 66th district. Incumbent Democrat Larry Womble, who has represented the 66th district since 1995, was re-elected here.

District 72
The new 72nd district overlaps with much of the former 67th district. Incumbent Democrat Warren C. Oldham, who has represented the 67th district since 1991, didn't seek re-election. Democrat Earline Parmon won the open seat.

District 73

District 74

District 75

District 76

District 77

District 78

District 79

Districts 80-99

District 80
The new 80th District overlaps with much of the former 94th district. Incumbent Republican Jerry Dockham, who has represented the 94th district and its predecessors since 1991, was re-elected here.

District 81
The new 81st district overlaps with much of the former 37th district. Incumbent Democrat Hugh Holliman, who has represented the 37th district since 2001, was re-elected here.

District 82
The new 82nd district overlaps with much of the western portion of the former 40th district. Incumbent Republican Gene Wilson, who has represented the 40th district since 1995, was re-elected here.

District 83
The new 83rd district overlaps with much of the western portion of the former 41st district. Incumbent Republican Tracy Walker, who has represented the 41st district since 2001, was re-elected here.

District 84
The new 84th district overlaps with much of the former 46th district. Incumbent Republicans Charles Buchanan and Gregory Thompson, who have represented the 46th district since 1995 and 1993 respectively, were both redistricted here. Phillip Frye defeated Buchanan in the Republican primary and easily won the general election.

District 85
The new 85th district overlaps with much of the former 49th district. Incumbent Republican Mitch Gillespie, who has represented the 49th district since 1999, was re-elected here.

District 86
The new 86th district overlaps with much of the former 47th district. Incumbent Democrat Walt Church, who has represented the 47th district since 1993, was re-elected here.

District 87
The new 87th district overlaps with much of the former 91st district. Incumbent Republican Edgar Starnes, who has represented the 91st district since 1997, was re-elected here.

District 88
The new 88th district overlaps with much of the northern portion of the former 45th district. Incumbent Republican Mark Hilton, who has represented the 45th district since 2001, was re-elected here.

District 89
The new 89th district overlaps with much of the former 43rd district. Incumbent Republican Mitchell Setzer, who has represented the 43rd district since 1999, was re-elected here.

District 90
The new 90th district overlaps with much of the center section of the old 40th district. Incumbent Republican William S. Hiatt, who has represented the 40th district since 1995, didn't seek re-election. Democrat Jim Harrell won the open seat.

District 91
The new 91st district overlaps with much of the eastern portion of the former 40th district. Incumbent Republican Rex Baker, who has represented the 91st district since 1995, was re-elected here.

District 92
The new 92nd district overlaps with much of the eastern portion of the former 41st district. Incumbent Republican George Holmes, who has represented the 41st district and its predecessors since 1979, was re-elected here.

District 93
The new 93rd district overlaps with much of the former 39th district. Incumbent Republican Lyons Gray, who has represented the 39th district since 1989, didn't seek re-election. Republican Bill McGee won the open seat.

District 94
the new 94th District overlaps with much of the former 84th district. Incumbent Republican Michael Decker, who has represented the 84th district and its predecessors since 1985, was re-elected here.

District 95
The new 95th district contains the southern portions of Catawba and Iredell counties and had no incumbent. Republican Karen Ray won the open seat.

District 96
The new 96th district overlaps with much of the former 42nd district. Incumbent Republican Franklin Mitchell, who has represented the 42nd district since 1993, was re-elected here.

District 97
The new 97th district overlaps with much of the southern portion of the former 45th district. Incumbent Republican Joe Kiser, who has represented the 45th district since 1995, was re-elected here.

District 98
The new 98th district is based in the northern portion of Mecklenburg County and has no incumbent. Republican John Rhodes won the open seat.

District 99
The new 99th district overlaps with much of the former 54th district. Incumbent Democrat Drew Saunders, who has represented the 54th district since 1997, was re-elected here.

Districts 100-120

District 100
The new 100th district overlaps with much of the former 36th district. Incumbent Speaker of the House Jim Black, who has represented the 36th district since 1991 and previously from 1981 to 1985, was re-elected here.

District 101
The new 101st district overlaps with much of the former 60th district. Incumbent Democrat Beverly Earle, who has represented the 60th district since 1995, was re-elected here.

District 102
The new 102nd district overlaps with much of the former 58th district. Incumbent Democrat Ruth Easterling, who has represented the 58th district and its predecessors since 1977, didn't seek re-election. Democrat Becky Carney won the open seat.

District 103
The new 103rd district overlaps with much of the former 69th district. Incumbent Republican Jim Gulley, who has represented the 69th district since 1997, was re-elected here.

District 104
The new 104th district overlaps with much of the former 57th district. Incumbent Republican Connie Wilson, who has represented the 57th district since 1993, was re-elected here.

District 105
The new 105th district overlaps with much of the former 55th district. Incumbent Republican Ed McMahan, who has represented the 105th district since 1995, was re-elected here.

District 106
The new 106th district overlaps with much of the former 56th district. Incumbent Democrat Martha Alexander, who has represented the 56th district since 1993, was re-elected here

District 107
The new 107th district overlaps with much of the former 59th district. Incumbent Democrat Pete Cunningham, who has represented the 59th district since 1987, was re-elected here.

District 108
The new 108th district overlaps with much of the former 93rd district. Incumbent Republican John Rayfield, who has represented the 93rd district since 1995, was re-elected here.

District 109
The new 109th district overlaps with much of the former 44th district. Incumbent Democrat Daniel W. Barefoot, who has represented the 44th district since 1999, didn't seek re-election. Republican Patrick McHenry won the open seat.

District 110
The new 110th district overlaps with the eastern portion of the former 48th district. Incumbent Republican Debbie Clary, who has represented the 48th district since 1995, was re-elected here.

District 111
The new 111th district overlaps with the central portion of the former 48th district. The district includes the homes of incumbent Republican John H. Weatherly, who has represented the 48th district since 1993, and Incumbent Democrat Andy Dedmon, who has represented the 48th district since 1997. Dedmon was defeated for re-election here by Republican Tim Moore.

District 112
The new 112th district includes all of Rutherford County and a portion of Cleveland County. The new district had no incumbent and was won by Democrat Bobby England.

District 113
The new 113th district overlaps with much of the former 68th district. Incumbent Republican Trudi Walend, who has represented the 68th district since 1999, was re-elected here.

District 114
The new 114th District overlaps with a portion of the former 51st district. Incumbent Democrat Martin Nesbitt, who has represented the 51st district and its predecessors since 1979, was re-elected here.

District 115
The new 115th district overlaps with much of the southeastern portion of the 51st district. Incumbent Republican Mark Crawford, who has represented the 51st district since 2001, lost re-election here to Democrat Bruce Goforth.

District 116
The new 116th district overlaps with much of the southwestern portion of the old 51st district. Incumbent Republican Wilma Sherrill, who has represented the 51st district since 1995, was re-elected here.

District 117
The new 117th district overlaps with much of the former 50th district. Incumbent Republican Larry Justus, who has represented the 50th district since 1985, was re-elected here.

District 118
The new 118th district overlaps with much of the northern portion of the former 52nd district. Incumbent Republican Margaret Carpenter, who has represented the 52nd district since 2001, lost re-election here to Democrat Ray Rapp.

District 119
The new 119th district overlaps with much of the southern portion of the former 52nd district. Incumbent Democrat Phil Haire, who has represented the 52nd district since 1999, was re-elected here.

District 120
The new 120th district overlaps with much of the former 53rd district. Incumbent Republican Roger West, who has represented the 53rd district since 2000, was re-elected here.

References

2002
2002 state legislature elections in the United States
2002 North Carolina elections